Vighodi (Vigodi) is a panchayat village in Gujarat, India. Administratively it is under Nakhatrana Taluka, Kutch District, Gujarat.  Vighodi lies along Gujarat State Highway 42 between the villages of Rawapur to the northwest and Ratadiya to the eastsoutheast.

There is only one village in the Vighodi gram panchayat: namely Vighodi.

Demographics 
In the 1964 census the village of Vighodi had 2,115 inhabitants, but by the 2011 census, the village had only 1,288 inhabitants, with 678 males (52.6%) and 610 females (47.4%), for a gender ratio of 900 females per thousand males.

Notes and references

Villages in Kutch district